Gloeotilopsis is a genus of green algae, in the order Ulotrichales.

References

External links

Ulotrichaceae
Ulvophyceae genera